Herbert E. Wolff (May 24, 1925April 17, 2009) was a United States Army Major General.

Early life and education
Wolff was born in Cologne, Germany on May 24, 1925. Wolff's family fled Nazi Germany in 1939 and moved to the United States.

Career

World War II
Wolff was drafted into the U.S. Army in 1943. He served in the Pacific Theater. He volunteered to join the Alamo Scouts and participated in the Raid at Cabanatuan. In 1945 he was given a battlefield commission to the rank of Second lieutenant and was awarded the Silver Star.

Service after World War II and during the Korean War
During the Korean War Wolff saw combat and earned a second Silver Star.

1960s and the Vietnam War
Wolff graduated from the Army War College.

Wolff's assignments during this period included the following:
Commanding Officer, Infantry Training Center, Fort Benning, Georgia (1967-1968)
Deputy Commanding General, US Army Training Center, Fort Dix, New Jersey (1968-1969)
Assistant Division Commander, 1st Infantry Division, South Vietnam (1969-1970)
Commanding General, Capital Military Assistance Command, South Vietnam (1970)

1970s to 1981
Wolff's assignments during this period included the following:
Commanding General, US Army Security Agency, Pacific, Hawaii (1970-1972)
Central Security Service, Fort Meade, Maryland (1970-1975)
Deputy Commander, V Corps, West Germany (1975-1977)
Commander, US Army CINCPAC Support Group and US Army Support Command, Hawaii (1977)
Commander, US Army Western Command (WESTCOM) (1979)

Wolff retired from active service in 1981.

Awards and decorations

Personal life
While still on active service in Hawaii, Wolff was instrumental in the preservation of Battery Randolph at Fort DeRussy and the creation of a museum there, founding the nonprofit Hawaii Army Museum Society in 1976 and serving as its president for more than 30 years.

After retiring from the U.S. Army in 1981, Wolff remained in Honolulu, Hawaii. Wolff died on April 17, 2009 in Honolulu, Hawaii and was buried at National Memorial Cemetery of the Pacific. He was survived by two sons and eight grandchildren.

References

External sources

 "Together we served" page

1925 births
2009 deaths
United States Army generals
Recipients of the Distinguished Service Medal (US Army)
Recipients of the Distinguished Flying Cross (United States)
Recipients of the Legion of Merit
Recipients of the Silver Star
United States Army Command and General Staff College alumni